The 2018 season was the fourth season of competitive association football and third season in the Liga 1 played by Bali United Football Club, a professional football club based in Gianyar, Bali, Indonesia. Their 2nd-place finish in 2017 meant it was their third successive season in Liga 1.

The main addition to the first team was striker Ilija Spasojević as they failed to negotiated new contracts for last season top scorer, Sylvano Comvalius. But they were successfully negotiated new contract with Nick van der Velden. Demerson, former Chapecoense player, and Kevin Brands were signed to complete their foreign players as they retained the service of Ahn Byung-keon. Two Indonesia national under-19 football team players, Feby Eka Putra and Hanis Saghara Putra also joined the team to fulfill under-23 quota. Before the league start, Kevin Brands was replaced by Miloš Krkotić; defender Mahamadou N'Diaye, midfielder Brwa Nouri, and striker Melvin Platje later signed in the second half transfer window to replace Demerson, Miloš Krkotić, and Ahn Byung-keon.

Bali United ended the season 11th, failed to continue their great performance from last season. The club were eliminated in preliminary round 2 of AFC Champions League by Chiangrai United, made them competed in AFC Cup where they were eliminated in the group stage after only finished in 4th. But they were advanced to the round of 32 of Piala Indonesia which would be continued in 2019.

Background 
The 2017 season was Indra Sjafri's third start to a season as manager of Bali United, having taken charge since the club's founded. Indra resigned in February 2017 before the start of the season because he was appointed as Indonesia national under-19 football team head coach. He was replaced by Hans-Peter Schaller, but only lasted for two games before being sacked due to two losses in a row. Then Widodo Cahyono Putro took charge in May 2017. Under him, Bali United almost won their first title before a controversial ending as Bhayangkara awarded a 3–0 win against Mitra Kukar and an additional three points. Bali United earn an opportunity to compete in the AFC Champions League because Bhayangkara failed to obtain an AFC license to participate in any Asian competitions.

Pre-season and friendlies

Friendlies

Indonesia President's Cup

Review and events

January–April 
Having finished second in the league last season, Bali United began their AFC Champions League campaign in the qualifying play-offs. They were drawn against S.League runners-up Tampines Rovers, which they won 3–1. Goals from captain Fadil Sausu, Ilija Spasojević, and Hanis Saghara Putra made them through to the preliminary round 2. But they failed to reach the group stage as they were defeated by Chiangrai United in Thailand a week later. This resulted them to played in AFC Cup.

Bali United were drawn into Group G with the runners-up from Myanmar, Philippines, and Vietnam: Yangon United, Global Cebu, and Thanh Hóa. Bali United opened their AFC Cup campaign with a 3–1 defeat against Yangon United. Goals from Sekou Sylla (2) and Emmanuel Uzochukwu can only be replied to one goal by I Gede Sukadana. The team earned a draw away to Global Cebu, but remained bottom of the group.

The team scored three goals in the second half against Thanh Hóa and won 3–1. Followed by a goalless draw in Vietnam against the same team. Bali United hosted the newly promoted PSMS at Kapten I Wayan Dipta on the opening weekend of the league season. A goal from Stefano Lilipaly earned Bali United a 1–0 win.

Bali United began April with a trip to Moch. Soebroto to face PSIS and a goalless draw became the result of this match. They faced Perseru at home. Midfielder Muhammad Taufiq gave the home team a deserved lead, before Sílvio Escobar scored for the visitors and made the game ended in a draw. On 11 April, Bali United continued their campaign in AFC Cup group stage with a 3–2 defeat and destroyed their hopes of qualified for the next round. In the league, for the third time in a row, they got a draw, this time against Persela. They finally got a victory after defeating Barito Putera with goals from Lilipaly and Yandi Munawar. Bali United finished their first AFC Cup campaign at the bottom of the group after they were beaten by Global Cebu at home. The team also ended their April in a bad fashion after a defeat away against PS TIRA.

May–August 
Their losing streak continued into May as they suffered two defeat in a row against Sriwijaya and Mitra Kukar. It ended with a narrow 1–0 win against Arema with a goal from Stefano Lilipaly. Two minor results, a lost to Borneo and a draw against Persib without scoring any goals, closed their May.

Two more points were dropped in Bali United's next match, away to Madura United on the first weekend of June. The hosts had taken the lead before I Nyoman Sukarja and Lilipaly scored for Bali United. But the team conceded the equaliser in 73rd minute. A goal from Lilipaly and Fadil Sausu earned Bali United a 2–0 win the following week, at home to Persipura.

Due to Lebaran, Bali United did not play another game for three weeks. On the resumption of club football, they faced PS West Sumbawa in the first round of the newly reborn Piala Indonesia which ended in a 4–0 win. Five days later, the league continued as Bali United away to Persebaya. Winger Irfan Jaya scored for the hosts eight minute before the final whistle, handed Bali United their fifth lost this season. On 11 July, Ilija Spasojević and Lilipaly scored for Bali United in a 2–0 win against PSM. Six days later, the team played Persija. Two goals of the match were scored by their new striker Melvin Platje and Lilipaly. At home, Bali United lost 3–2 to Bhayangkara; striker Marinus Wanewar scored the winning goal for the visitors and extend the results of their never winning over Bhayangkara since 2016. Bali United ended the month with a 2–1 victory over hosts PSMS; striker Spasojević scoring and Dias Angga Putra adding a further goal.

Bali United's form improved as the second half of the season open. At home to PSIS on 4 August, the team earned three points courtesy of Fadil and Platje. Platje again scored the goal along with Spasojević in Bali United's match against Perseru.

September–December 
In their next match, Bali United defeated Persela by three goals to two; the winner was a penalty scored by Melvin Platje. They were then held by Barito Putera to 1–1 draw. Two more points were dropped in Bali United's next match, at home to PS TIRA on the final day of September.

The first week of October saw Bali United away to Sriwijaya at Gelora Sriwijaya. Sriwijaya managed to lead three goals before Ilija Spasojević and Platje narrowed the score. Bali United defeated Mitra Kukar 1–0 on 15 October 2018 when a goal from Platje secured the win. At Kanjuruhan, Bali United lost 3–1 to Arema; defender Hanif Sjahbandi scored twice against Bali United defense. They ended the October with 2–2 and 1—1 draws against Borneo and Persib respectively.

Starting November, Fadil Sausu and Platje each scored as Madura United were beaten by two goals. After that win, they suffered three lost in a row for the rest of the month. Lost to Persipura 0–1, at home to Persebaya 2–5, and destroyed by PSM 0–4 drop them in the table even more.

In preparation for the final match at home in the league this season, there was a controversy in which Widodo Cahyono Putro suddenly resigned from his position as head coach of the team. In a thrilling match that was stopped several times due to flares from supporters, Bali United suffered a narrow 1–2 defeat from Persija. Bali United lost their final game of the league campaign, away to Bhayangkara. It was a lacklustre performance by the visitors, which conceded two goals inside the 20th minute. They then faced Persekabpas at away in the next round of Piala Indonesia; a goal apiece from Fadil and Spasojević secured a comfortable 2–0 victory.

Match results

Liga 1

Piala Indonesia

AFC Champions League

AFC Cup

Player details

Appearances and goals 

|- class="sortbottom"
! colspan="14"| Players transferred out during the season
|-

Disciplinary record 

|- class="sortbottom"
! colspan="19"| Players transferred out during the season
|-

Transfers

Transfers in

Transfers out

Loans out

Notes

References 

Bali United F.C. seasons
Bali United